Scalphunter (John Greycrow) is a fictional mutant villain character appearing in American comic books published by Marvel Comics.

Publication history

His first appearance was in The Uncanny X-Men #210, during the Mutant Massacre event. This character was created by Chris Claremont, John Romita Jr. and Dan Green.

Fictional character biography

Assembling the Marauders
Scalphunter is a member of the Comanche tribe of Native Americans who originally fought in World War II for the United States but was to be executed for murdering his fellow officers. He is shot by a firing squad and is believed dead. However, he survives and is found and recruited by enigmatic mastermind Mister Sinister early on. Later, apparently not working under Sinister, he kills the employer of the savage mutant Sabretooth and offers Sabretooth money to join Scalphunter's boss as a mercenary, which Sabretooth accepts.

Years later, he meets the thief Gambit; The Uncanny X-Men #324 reveals that Greycrow and Gambit were once co-workers at an Arizona diner, where they and waitress Claire De Luc comprised a trio of close friends. Gambit would later recruit Scalphunter as a member of the Marauders, a band of assassins operating under, by apparent coincidence, his one-time boss Sinister (and reuniting him with one-time ally Sabretooth, who was field leader for the loose team), who sends the Marauders to massacre the entire underground mutant community known as the Morlocks. He shoots young Morlock Tommy after using her to lead the group to "The Alley," the Morlock's home in the tunnels. Gambit apparently follows the Marauders, having learned of their intentions, and manages to save one Morlock, who will grow to be Marrow. As seen in flashback in Gambit (third series) #8, Gambit was appalled that Greycrow would be involved in such a massacre, suggesting that at the time Gambit knew little of Greycrow's violent past. In the course of the Mutant Massacre, the Marauders clash with the X-Men and the original X-Factor team, as well as Thor and Power Pack, leaving several Marauders dead.

Subsequently, the X-Men thwart the Marauders' attempt to assassinate Sinister's former pawn, Madelyne Pryor, in San Francisco. Failing, they try once more in New York City  during the demonic invasion Inferno event. During this time, Sinister cloned the entire band of Marauders, to replace any members of the team who are killed with exact replicas (as was done in the case of the Marauder known as Riptide). Scalphunter manages to live throughout his encounters with heroes, ⁣ but when the Marauders later fight dimensionally-displaced Nate Grey after trying to  assassinate Sinister's former servant, Threnody, he is killed and then cloned. When Sinister poses as Dr. Robert Windsor a scientist in the Weapon X program, Scalphunter is still helping him obtain mutant DNA, as Sinister supposedly helps prisoners escape, only to take them to his own labs for experimentation.

Post Decimation
Scalphunter is one of the still-powered mutants living in tents on the Xavier Institute lawn after almost all mutants were depowered on following the events of the "Decimation" storyline. When immortal mutant Apocalypse comes, Scalphunter leaves and serves him. When Havok warns Scalphunter and fellow Apocalypse recruits Fever Pitch and Skids that they are in over their heads, Scalphunter replies that Apocalypse has explained that he is on the side of mutants in this case, as they are in danger of becoming extinct.

In the "X-Men: Messiah Complex" storyline, following Apocalypse's defeat, Scalphunter returns to his master and rejoined the Marauders. Scalphunter is involved in the initial assault on Cooperstown, Alaska for the mutant child. During the X-Men's search for the mutant child he shoots and badly injures Nightcrawler. He later assists the team in their defense of Sinister's base from the X-Men on Muir Island. During the battle, he shoots Wolverine in the head, but subsequently is pinned to the wall with one of Warpath's knives when he tries to kill Hepzibah.

In X-Men: Divided We Stand, after Sinister's defeat and the death and disbanding of the rest of the Marauders, Scalphunter flees to a small town in the desert, where he is again working at a diner as a cook. He fears the X-Men are going to kill him, and has fully gone into hiding. A preacher begins to eat at the diner, and constantly plagues Scalphunter with incessant chatter. One night, Nightcrawler attacks Scalphunter in his trailer, revealing that he was the preacher, in disguise. Scalphunter tries to kill him, but is easily defeated. Nightcrawler tells him that he sought him out to kill him, but changed his mind as he realized that Scalphunter had no soul - he was just a copy of a copy. He then forgives Scalphunter for all his sins, past and future, then leaves. The next day, Scalphunter is seen back in the diner cooking, now wearing a gold cross. He also has tried to mend fences with the X-Men, notifying them of a break-in at one of Sinister's old labs.

During the "X-Men: Utopia" storyline, Scalphunter is captured by a group of non-mutant superhumans and forced to fly a cargo of five mutant-eating creatures to the X-Men on Utopia.

Dawn of X
In the new status quo for mutants post House of X and Powers of X, Professor X and Magneto invite all mutants to live on Krakoa and welcome even former enemies into their fold.

Some time later, he joins a loose group of outcast mutants, operating under Mister Sinister: the Hellions, which also comprise Havok, Kwannon, Empath, Wildchild, Nanny and Orphan Maker.

Powers and abilities
Scalphunter's mutant powers include superior regenerative abilities, which may slow his aging to a degree. He also has techno-morphing powers, which allow him to construct various mechanical devices at a superhuman rate. This is achieved using the numerous components attached to his costume, yet it is unclear if these abilities are also mutant powers or rather derived from his costume. Scalphunter is an extraordinary master of conventional firearms, and has been known to use a wide variety of weaponry which include but are not exclusive to edged cutlery, pistols, rifles, shotguns, laser guns, and miniature cannons.

Other versions
In the 2005 "House of M" storyline, Greycrow appears as the captain of the S.H.I.E.L.D. Helicarrier. He is telepathically coerced by Emma Frost into flying the Helicarrier to Genosha.

In X-Men: The End, Scalphunter is a member of Sinister's team of Marauders sent to kill X-Force and Apocalypse while capturing Cable. He fires the bullet which infects Irene Merriwether/Apocalypse and Shatterstar with the Technarx assimilation nanites. He then wounds a distracted Cable but is killed by Domino soon after.

References

Characters created by Chris Claremont
Comics characters introduced in 1986
Cyborg supervillains
Fictional Comanche people
Fictional inventors
Fictional mercenaries in comics
Fictional murderers
Fictional World War II veterans
Marvel Comics characters with accelerated healing
Marvel Comics cyborgs
Marvel Comics military personnel
Marvel Comics mutants
Marvel Comics supervillains